The spotted fantail (Rhipidura perlata) is a species of bird in the family Rhipiduridae.

It is found throughout Sumatra, Borneo and the southern Malay Peninsula. Its natural habitat is subtropical or tropical moist lowland forests.

References

spotted fantail
Birds of Malesia
spotted fantail
Taxonomy articles created by Polbot